Minia  may refer to:
Munia (also called a "minia"), a bird of the genus Lonchura
Minya, Egypt, a city in Egypt
Minya Governorate, a governorate in Egypt
Miniya, translation of minnie in magadhi

See also
Minya (disambiguation)